is a volleyball video game featuring many of the popular Sanrio characters including Hello Kitty, Keroppi and Minna no Tabo. Matches can be played in with either two, three or four players. Players can choose between three different tracks of background music, or to simply play without the music.

The game is basically a volleyball/tennis game but without the nets, closely resembling four-square. There is an option to increase the difficulty level that modifies the level of intelligence with which computer-controlled play. There are opportunities to commit do-overs. After the end of the game, the player is awarded with a large ostrich trophy.

Though the game was released exclusively in Japan, a fan translation to English was made.

External links

1992 video games
Beach volleyball video games
Character Soft games
Fantasy sports video games
Japan-exclusive video games
Nintendo Entertainment System games
Nintendo Entertainment System-only games
Sanrio video games
Video games based on anime and manga
Video games developed in Japan
Multiplayer and single-player video games
Hello Kitty video games
Video games scored by Manami Matsumae